The Alpengarten Pforzheim is a commercial nursery with botanical garden specializing in alpine plants. It is located at Auf dem Berg 6, Pforzheim, Baden-Württemberg, Germany, and open weekdays in the warmer months; an admission fee is charged. The garden contains over 100,000 plants from all mountain areas of the world. Its main flowering period is from late April to mid-June when the Alpine roses and rhododendrons bloom.

See also 
 List of botanical gardens in Germany

External links 
 Alpengarten Pforzheim
 GardenVisit entry
 Trivago entry
 Deutsche-Museen entry
 WebMuseen entry

Pforzheim, Alpengarten
Pforzheim, Alpengarten
Buildings and structures in Pforzheim